HMCS Beauharnois was a modified  that served with the Royal Canadian Navy during the Second World War, primarily in the Battle of the Atlantic. After the war it was sold to a Jewish resettlement movement and eventually made its way into the nascent Israeli Navy.

Background

Flower-class corvettes like Beauharnois serving with the Royal Canadian Navy during the Second World War were different to earlier and more traditional sail-driven corvettes.  The "corvette" designation was created by the French as a class of small warships; the Royal Navy borrowed the term for a period but discontinued its use in 1877. During the hurried preparations for war in the late 1930s, Winston Churchill reactivated the corvette class, needing a name for smaller ships used in an escort capacity, in this case based on a whaling ship design. The generic name "flower" was used to designate the class of these ships, which – in the Royal Navy – were named after flowering plants.

Corvettes commissioned by the Royal Canadian Navy during the Second World War were named after communities for the most part, to better represent the people who took part in building them. This idea was put forth by Admiral Percy W. Nelles. Sponsors were commonly associated with the community for which the ship was named. Royal Navy corvettes were designed as open sea escorts, while Canadian corvettes were developed for coastal auxiliary roles which was exemplified by their minesweeping gear. Eventually the Canadian corvettes would be modified to allow them to perform better on the open seas.

Construction
Beauharnois was ordered in June 1942 as part of the 1943-44 Increased Endurance Flower-class building program, which followed the main layout of the 1942-43 program. The only significant difference is that the majority of the 43-44 program replaced the 2-pounder Mk.VIII single "pom-pom" anti-aircraft gun with two twin 20 mm and two single 20 mm anti-aircraft guns. She was laid down as Buckingham before her name was changed to Beauharnois on 8 November 1943 by Morton Engineering & Dry Dock Co. in Quebec City. She was launched 11 May 1944 and commissioned 25 September of that year in Quebec City.

War service
After working up in Bermuda, Beauharnois joined the Mid-Ocean Escort Force escort group C-4 and worked escorting convoys across the Atlantic. Due to her late entry into the war, she did not see much action, and her final duties of the war consisted of escorting the cable ship .

Post-war service
Beauharnois was paid off 12 July 1945 at Sorel. She was sold to Mossad LeAliyah Bet in 1946 along with the ex-. The two ships were used to smuggle Jewish immigrants into British-held Palestine as part of the Aliyah Bet. She was impounded in Haifa until Israel's independence. She was then commissioned in the Israeli Navy and fought during the 1948 Arab-Israeli War, including the Israeli naval campaign in Operation Yoav. She was retired in 1954 and scrapped in 1956.

Notes

External links

 
 

1944 ships
Flower-class corvettes of the Royal Canadian Navy
Corvettes of the Israeli Navy